Manuel 'Manolo' Reina Rodríguez (born 1 April 1985) is a Spanish professional footballer who plays for Málaga CF as a goalkeeper.

Club career
Born in Villanueva del Trabuco, Málaga, Andalusia, Reina was a product of hometown Málaga CF's youth system. He appeared in one game with the first team in the 2005–06 season, against Valencia CF in a 0–0 home draw, as they went on to rank last in La Liga.

In 2007, Reina joined Levante UD, but played mainly for the reserves during his early spell. However, the club's severe financial crisis led to him becoming first choice after the departure of Marco Storari; in eight matches, he conceded 18 goals.

Reina totalled 48 appearances the next two seasons, the last of them ending in top-flight promotion. For 2010–11 he was initially deemed second choice, to newly signed Gustavo Munúa. However, after the Uruguayan conceded ten goals in the first three matches, he was selected for the next two rounds, keeping clean sheets against UD Almería (1–0 away win) and Real Madrid (0–0, at home); he eventually lost his starting position again, finishing the campaign with 18 games as the Valencians eventually retained their status.

On 20 June 2011, Reina signed for FC Cartagena of the second division. After their relegation he moved abroad for the first time in his career, joining Cypriot First Division's AEP Paphos FC.

Reina switched teams and countries again on 30 January 2013, signing with Super League Greece club Atromitos F.C. as a replacement for PAOK FC-bound Charles Itandje. He was mostly a backup to Velimir Radman, and left in June after making no competitive appearances.

On 2 July 2013, Reina returned to his country and penned a contract with Segunda División B side Gimnàstic de Tarragona. He was an undisputed starter during his four-year spell, achieving promotion to the second division in his second season.

Reina cut ties with the club on 6 July 2017, and signed for RCD Mallorca 13 days later. He won two consecutive promotions to return to the top tier – always as first choice – adding another one at the end of the 2020–21 campaign.

Reina returned to the La Rosaleda Stadium in June 2022 after 15 years away, on a two-year deal.

Career statistics

Club

Honours
Gimnàstic
Segunda División B: 2014–15

Mallorca
Segunda División B: 2017–18

References

External links

1985 births
Living people
Sportspeople from the Province of Málaga
Spanish footballers
Footballers from Andalusia
Association football goalkeepers
La Liga players
Segunda División players
Segunda División B players
Atlético Malagueño players
Málaga CF players
Atlético Levante UD players
Levante UD footballers
FC Cartagena footballers
Gimnàstic de Tarragona footballers
RCD Mallorca players
Cypriot First Division players
AEP Paphos FC players
Atromitos F.C. players
Spanish expatriate footballers
Expatriate footballers in Cyprus
Expatriate footballers in Greece
Spanish expatriate sportspeople in Cyprus
Spanish expatriate sportspeople in Greece